Romane Bernies (born 27 June 1993) is a French basketball player for Basket Lattes and the French national team.

She participated at the 2018 FIBA Women's Basketball World Cup.

References

External links

1993 births
Living people
French women's basketball players
Sportspeople from Agen
Point guards